Edvin Landsem (27 February 1925 – 31 August 2004) was a Norwegian cross-country skier. Competing in the 50 km event he finished seventh at the 1952 Winter Olympics, fifth at the 1954 FIS Nordic World Ski Championships and 15th at the 1956 Winter Olympics.

Cross-country skiing results
All results are sourced from the International Ski Federation (FIS).

Olympic Games

World Championships

References

External links

Olympic 50 km cross country skiing results: 1948–64

Cross-country skiers at the 1952 Winter Olympics
Cross-country skiers at the 1956 Winter Olympics
Norwegian male cross-country skiers
Olympic cross-country skiers of Norway
1925 births
2004 deaths
People from Rindal
Sportspeople from Møre og Romsdal